This article lists the winners and nominees for the Black Reel Award for Outstanding Director of a Television Movie or Limited Series. The category was retired during the 2008 ceremony, and then later returned in 2013. In May 2017 the category was moved from the film awards as part of the Black Reel Awards for Television honors thus resulting in two separate winners in 2017.

Winners and nominees
Winners are listed first and highlighted in bold.

2000s

2010s

2020s

Total awards by network

 HBO – 7
 Showtime – 3
 BET - 2
 FX - 2
 Amazon Prime Video - 1
 Lifetime - 1
 Netflix - 1
 USA Network - 1

Programs with multiple awards

Programs with multiple nominations

4 nominations 
 American Crime (ABC) 

3 nominations
 American Horror Story (FX)

2 nominations
 American Crime Story (FX)
 Seven Seconds (Netflix)
 Small Axe (Amazon Prime Video)
 Watchmen (HBO)

Individuals with multiple awards

2 awards
 Reggie Rock Bythewood
 Vondie Curtis-Hall

Individuals with multiple nominations

4 nominations
 Ernest R. Dickerson
 Spike Lee

3 nominations
 Angela Bassett
 Julie Dash
 Victoria Mahoney
 Robert Townsend

2 nominations
 Reggie Rock Bythewood
 Vondie Curtis-Hall
 Bill Duke
 Anthony Hemingway
 Kevin Hooks
 Kenny Leon
 Darnell Martin
 Steve McQueen
 Dee Rees
 John Ridley
 Stephen Williams
 George C. Wolfe

References

Black Reel Awards